Daniel Gardner  is a Canadian electronic musician known better by his artist name Frivolous. Born in 1980, near Vancouver, B.C., Gardner received early training in classical piano, but found his calling when he undertook Electronic Music studies. He moved to Montreal in the early 2000s and then to Berlin in 2005. In 2012, Gardner returned to Canada's west coast, while continuing to maintain his Berlin ties and tour internationally.

Though Gardner is included in the techno and house genres, his style is also described as jazz-inflected microhouse.  He is known for his improvised live performances which have included his DIY instruments such as the electromagnetic knife.  He has more than 40 releases to his credit, including the 2014 album Lost and Forgotten, which followed his third full-length album, Meteorology, released in 2011, on Luciano's Cadenza label.

Discography

Albums
 Somewhere In The Suburbs (2004)
 Midnight Black Indulgence (2007)
 Meteorology (2011)
 Lost and Forgotten (2014)

Singles and EPs
 Crankkongestion (2002)
 Romantek EP (2003)
 40 Inch EP (2003)
 Whonnock BC EP (2004)
 Coquitlam BC (2004)
 XXX EP (2005)
 Impermeable Disguise 12" (2005)
 Kevork Motion EP (2005)
 Buffet Haraja 12" (2005)
 Frivolous vs The Phantom 12" (2006)
 Midnight Black Indulgence 12", EP (2007)
 The Emoticon Don EP (2008)
 Moonshine EP (2008)
 Island of Sanctity 12" (2008)
 Couples Therapy (2009)
 C: My Consciousness (2011)
 Sauna Stranger EP (2014)

Notes

References
Frivolous Discography at Discogs
RA: Frivolous Resident Advisor
Frivolous - Artist Bio CBC Music - Frivolous, Artist Bio CBC Music
Mutek Artists - Frivolous Mutek Hub, Artists  
Meoko Interview, (Aug. 23, 2012) Frivolous Talks to Meoko Meoko
Thompson, Joanne (June 28, 2011) Canadian X's - From Here to There & Back Again? Canadian Artists & Producers Gone to Berlin  Mutek Mag
Nasrallah, Dmitri (March 8, 2011) Album Review - Frivolous: Meteorology Exclaim!
MacPherson, Alex (March 3, 2011) Factmagazine Review - Frivolous: Meteorology Fact Magazine
Morris, Dustin (May 31, 2011) Frivolous Mutek Performance, Review Frivolous at Metropolis, May 30, 2013 Exclaim!
Pikniclectronik Montreal (July 2011) Piknicelectronic Artists - Frivolous Piknicelectronik
Annie, (April 5, 2011) Fabriclondon - Frivolous Gear Guide and Live Set Fabriclondon
Tullock, Emily (Nov 8, 2011) Frivolous: DIY Inspiration Pulse Radio Interview
Morton, Doug (Feb 8, 2007) Review - Frivolous: Midnight Black Indulgence XLR8R
Koesch, Sascha (March 24, 2014) De:bug Album Review - Frivolous: Lost and Forgotten  De:bug Magazine
Frivolous: Sauna Stranger EP (Frieda Musik) July 7, 2014
Izarra, Gaby (Feb. 5, 2014) Frivolous Talks Lost & Forgotten and Artistic Liberation Mybeatfix

Canadian electronic musicians
1980 births
Living people